Necyopa is a genus of moths in the family Geometridae erected by Francis Walker in 1861.

Species
Necyopa flatipennata Walker, 1862 Borneo, Peninsular Malaysia
Necyopa ioge Prout, 1932 Borneo
Necyopa subtriangula Prout, 1932 Borneo
Necyopa chloana (Prout, 1926) Borneo
Necyopa triangularis (Warren, 1896) Java
Necyopa picta (Warren, 1896) Java

References

Boarmiini